John Charles McDermott (17 May 1872 – 5 February 1925) was an  Australian rules footballer who played with South Melbourne in the Victorian Football League (VFL).

He died after falling from a ladder while erecting a veranda in Yackandandah.

Notes

External links 

1872 births
1925 deaths
Australian rules footballers from Victoria (Australia)
Sydney Swans players